Paul James Kenny (April 11, 1932 – December 1, 2013) was a Canadian politician. He served in the Legislative Assembly of New Brunswick from 1978 to 1991 as a Liberal member from the constituency of Bathurst. He died of cancer in 2013.

References

1932 births
2013 deaths